Brachymeles is a genus of skinks (lizards in the family Scincidae). The majority of the species within the genus are endemic to certain island ecosystems in the Philippines. In 2018, the Zoological Society of London through its EDGE of Existence Program listed the Cebu small worm skink (Brachymeles cebuensis) as the 80th most evolutionarily distinct and globally endangered reptile species in the world, making it the most endangered member of the genus Brachymeles.

Taxonomy
Brachymeles is usually placed in the subfamily Scincinae, which seems to be paraphyletic however. Apparently part of a clade which does not seem to include the type genus Scincus, it will probably be eventually assigned to a new, yet-to-be-named subfamily (Austin & Arnold 2006).

Species
The following species are accepted at The Reptile Database:

Brachymeles apus  – Hikida's short-legged skink
Brachymeles bicolandia  – Bicol slender skink
Brachymeles bicolor  – two-colored short-legged skink
Brachymeles boholensis  – Bohol short-legged skink 
Brachymeles bonitae  – stub-limbed burrowing skink, pretty short-legged skink
Brachymeles boulengeri  – Boulenger's short-legged skink
Brachymeles brevidactylus  – Southern Bicol slender skink
Brachymeles burksi  – Burks's burrowing skink
Brachymeles cebuensis  – listed as an EDGE species by the Zoological Society of London – Rabor's short-legged skink
Brachymeles cobos  – Catanduañes slender skink
Brachymeles dalawangdaliri  – Tablas slender skink
Brachymeles elerae  – common short-legged skink
Brachymeles gracilis  – graceful short-legged skink
Brachymeles hilong  – graceful short-legged skink
Brachymeles ilocandia  – Ilokano slender skink  
Brachymeles isangdaliri  – Aurora slender skink
Brachymeles kadwa  – Jessi's slender skink
Brachymeles libayani  – Lapinig Islands slender skink
Brachymeles ligtas  – Lubang slender skink
Brachymeles lukbani 
Brachymeles makusog 
Brachymeles mapalanggaon  – Masbate slender skink
Brachymeles mindorensis  – Mindoro short-legged skink 
Brachymeles minimus  
Brachymeles miriamae  – Miriam's skink
Brachymeles muntingkamay  – Caraballo Mountains loam-swimming skink
Brachymeles orientalis  – southern burrowing skink
Brachymeles paeforum  – PAEF slender skink
Brachymeles pathfinderi  – pathfinder short-legged skink
Brachymeles samad  – Eastern Visayas slender skink
Brachymeles samarensis  – Brown's short-legged skink
Brachymeles schadenbergi  – Schadenberg's burrowing skink 
Brachymeles suluensis  – graceful short-legged skink
Brachymeles talinis  – Duméril's short-legged skink
Brachymeles taylori  – Taylor's short-legged skink
Brachymeles tiboliorum  – Western Mindanao slender skink
Brachymeles tridactylus  – three-fingered short-legged skink 
Brachymeles tungaoi  – Tungao's slender skink
Brachymeles vermis  – Taylor's short-legged skink
Brachymeles vindumi  – Jens's slender skink
Brachymeles vulcani  – Camiguin Sur slender skink
Brachymeles wrighti  – Wright's short-legged skink

Nota bene: A binomial authority in parentheses indicates that the species was originally described in a genus other than Brachymeles.

References

Further reading
 (2006). "Using ancient and recent DNA to explore relationships of extinct and endangered Leiolopisma skinks (Reptilia: Scincidae) in the Mascarene islands". Molecular Phylogenetics and Evolution 39 (2): 503–511.  (HTML abstract).
 (1887). Catalogue of the Lizards in the British Museum (Natural History). Second Edition. Volume III. ... Scincidæ ... London: Trustees of the British Museum (Natural History). (Taylor and Francis, printers). xii + 575 pp. + Plates I-XL. (Genus Brachymeles, p. 386).
 (1839). Erpétologie générale ou Histoire naturelle complète des Reptiles. Tome cinquième [Volume 5]. Paris: Roret. viii + 854 pp. (Brachymeles, new genus, p. 776). (in French).

 
Lizard genera
Taxa named by André Marie Constant Duméril
Taxa named by Gabriel Bibron